Sastry may refer to:

People
 Ajay Sastry (born 1975), director and writer
 Ann Marie Sastry, American engineer, educator, and businessperson
 Arvind Sastry (born 1990), screenwriter
 B. V. K. Sastry (1916–2003), writer and music critic
 Bhagavatula Sadasiva Shankara Sastry
 Bulusu Jaganadha Sastry (1912–1985), electrical engineer and philanthropist
 Chellapilla Satyanarayana Sastry
 Chellapilla Venkata Sastry (1870–1950), Telugu language poet laureate and scholar
 Devudu Narasimha Sastri (1895–1962), Kannada writer, novelist, Sanskrit scholar, ritualist, actor and journalist
 Devulapalli Krishnasastri (1887–1980), Telugu poet, playwright, and translator
 Dhulipala Seetarama Sastry (1921–2007)
 Divakarla Tirupati Sastry (1872–1920), Telugu language poet and scholar
 Emani Sankara Sastry (1922–1987), Veena player of Carnatic music
 Gangadhara Sastry (born 1967), Indian singer and composer
 Garikapati Narahari Sastry (born 1966), Indian chemist
 J. C. M. SastryIndian (1936–2005), Nephrologist .
 Jandhyala Papayya Sastry (1912–1992), Telugu writer and lyricist
 Jandhyala Subramanya Sastry Indian film screenwriter, director and actor
 K. N. T. Sastry (1945–2018), National Award winning Telugu film director.
 Kaliakudi Natesa Sastry, exponent of Harikatha
 Kapali Sastry (1886–1953), Sanskrit scholar, author, translator, and disciple of Sri Aurobindo
 Kasibhatta Brahmaiah Sastry (1863–1940), Sanskrit and Telugu scholar
 Madhunapantula Satyanarayana Sastry (1920–1992), poet
 Malladi Chandrasekhara Sastry (born 1925), scholar and television personality
 Malladi Ramakrishna Sastry (1905–1965), Telugu writer
 Melattur Venkatarama Sastry (1770–1830), Telugu poet and playwright
 Mokkapati Narasimha Sastry (1892–1973), Indian Telugu language novelist
 Murali Sastry (born 1959), Indian scientist
 Panchagnula Adinarayana Sastry (1890–1951)
 Patrayani Seetharama Sastrya singer, teacher and music composer of Andhra
 Penumarti Viswanatha Sastry (1929–1998), Telugu writer and editor
 Podili Brahmayya Sastry
 Puranam Srinivasa Sastry (born 1953), Indian writer
 R. V. S. Peri Sastri, former Chief Election Commissioner of India
 Rachakonda Viswanatha Sastry (1922–1993), writer of in Telugu literature
 Ramajogayya Sastry (born 1970), Indian Telugu lyricist
 Ramayanam Sarveswara Sastry (1889–1962), actor
 Rambhatla Lakshminarayana Sastry (1908–1995), Telugu and Sanskrit scholar
 Ravi Shastri (born 1962), Indian Cricketer
 S. Shankar Sastry, Dean of the College of Engineering at the University of California, Berkeley.
 Savitha Sastry (born 1969), Bharatanatyam Dancer
 Sirivennela Sitaramasastri
 Sosale Garalapury Sastry (1899–1955), Indian industrial chemist
 Srikanth Sastry, Boston University Professor awarded the Shanti Swarup Bhatnagar
 Sripada Krishnamurty Sastry (1866–1960), poet
 Sripada Subrahmanya Sastry (1891–1961), Telugu writer from Andhra Pradesh
 Trilochan Sastry, former Dean at Indian Institute of Management, Bangalore
 Tripuraribhatla Ramakrishna Sastry (1914–1998), actor
 V. Kutumba Sastry (born 1950), Indian academic. He was the Vice-Chancellor of the Rashtriya Sanskrit Sansthan.
 Veda Archana Sastry, Indian film actress
 Vedam Venkataraya Sastry (1853–1929), Sanskrit and Telugu poet and critic
 Vedantam Ramalinga Sastry, Indian classical dancer in Kuchipudi
 Veluri Venkata Krishna Sastry, archaeologist and historian in Andhra Pradesh
 Vuppuluri Ganapathi Sastry (1898–1989), Indian sanskrit scholar, writer, and spiritual teacher
 Madhavapeddi Chinna Venkanna Sastry 
Sanskrit professor, author, poet

See also
 Sastri
 Sastry automorphism, in mathematics, an automorphism of a field of characteristic 2
 Shastry

Indian surnames
Hindu surnames